Herberger is a German surname. Notable people with the surname include:

Albert J. Herberger (born c. 1933), United States admiral
John Herberger (1919–2002), German footballer and manager
Sepp Herberger (1897–1977), German footballer and manager
Valerius Herberger (1562–1627), German Lutheran theologian and writer

See also 
Herberger's, an American department store chain
Herberger Institute for Design and the Arts, fine arts college at Arizona State University
Herberger Theater Center, indoor performance venue in Phoenix, Arizona

German-language surnames